The 1933 Lower Hutt mayoral election was part of the New Zealand local elections held that same year. The elections were held for the role of Mayor of Lower Hutt plus other local government positions including the nine borough councillors, also elected biennially. The polling was conducted using the standard first-past-the-post electoral method.

Background
The incumbent mayor, William Thomas Strand, declined to seek re-election. Four candidates put themselves forward for the mayoralty. Local businessman, and former Masterton Borough Councillor, Jack Andrews defeated Alexander McBain, a member of the Lower Hutt Borough Council since 1921, to win the mayoralty. Two other candidates campaigned on behalf of the unemployed but polled far less than Andrews and McBain.

Mayoral results

Councillor results

Notes

References

Mayoral elections in Lower Hutt
1933 elections in New Zealand
Politics of the Wellington Region